Euzebyella marina is a Gram-negative and aerobic bacterium from the genus of Euzebyella which has been isolated from seawater from the Yellow Sea.

References 

Flavobacteria
Bacteria described in 2017